Damien Quinn (born 1980) is an Irish hurler who currently plays as a goalkeeper and captain of the Antrim senior team.

Quinn made his first appearance for the team during the 2000 championship and became a regular player over subsequent seasons until 2007.  In 2012 Quinn returned to the Antrim panel as captain.  During that time he has won six Ulster winners' medals and one Christy Ring Cup winners' medal.

At club level Quinn is an All-Ireland medalist with Loughgiel Shamrocks. In addition to this he has also won two Ulster medals and two county club championship medals.

References

Team

1980 births
Living people
Loughgiel Shamrocks hurlers
Antrim inter-county hurlers
Ulster inter-provincial hurlers
Hurling goalkeepers